The 2022 FIBA Europe SuperCup Women is set to be the 11th edition of the FIBA Europe SuperCup Women. It will be held on 18 October 2022 at the Palais des sports du Prado in Bourges, France.

Final

References

External links
 SuperCup Women

2022
2022–23 in European women's basketball
2022–23 in French basketball
International women's basketball competitions hosted by France
October 2022 sports events in France